Elections to Bolton Metropolitan Borough Council were held on 3 May 2007. One third of the council was up for election and the council stayed under no overall control.

20 seats were contested with the Labour Party winning 10 seats, the Conservatives 7 and the Liberal Democrats 3.

After the election, the composition of the council was
Labour 26
Conservative 22
Liberal Democrat 12

Election result

Council Composition
Prior to the election the composition of the council was:

After the election the composition of the council was:

Ward results

Astley Bridge ward

Bradshaw ward

Breightmet ward

Bromley Cross ward

Crompton ward

Farnworth ward

Great Lever ward

Halliwell ward

Harper Green ward

Heaton and Lostock ward

Horwich and Blackrod ward

Horwich North East ward

Hulton ward

Kearsley ward

Little Lever and Darcy Lever ward

Rumworth ward

Smithills ward

Tonge with the Haulgh ward

Weshoughton North and Chew Moor ward

Weshoughton South ward

References

 Bolton Council election results in full, The Bolton Evening News, first published 4 May 2007.
 Labour beat of Tory challenge to tighten grip in council chamber, The Bolton Evening News, first published 4 May 2007.
 

2007
2007 English local elections
2000s in Greater Manchester